Cloondara is a small village in County Longford, Ireland. It is situated just off the N5 road near Termonbarry, where the Royal Canal terminates at the River Shannon. The Royal Canal is being upgraded so that canal boats can once again travel along it. The village of Termonbarry lies to the west of the village, on the opposite bank of the River Shannon. Many residential properties are being built, due to the tax incentives available in the area.

See also
 List of towns and villages in Ireland

References

Towns and villages in County Longford